Stephan Stompor (14 February 1931 – 23 October 1995) was a German musicologist and dramaturg.

Life 
In 1967, wurde er Dramaturg an der Komische Oper Berlin, wo er mit den Intendanten Walter Felsenstein and Joachim Herz sowie mit Götz Friedrich zusammenarbeitete. 1975 wurde er mit der Dissertation Deutschsprachige Aufführungen von Opern Händels im 18. Jahrhundert in Halle promoviert. Stompor gab Programmhefte und Libretti heraus. Er verfasste Beiträge zur Geschichte des Musiktheaters, insbesondere über die Zeit des Nationalsozialismus. Aufgrund seiner schweren Erkrankung konnten Teile seiner Arbeit erst postum veröffentlicht werden.

Stompor died in Berlin at the age of 64.

Publications 
 Jüdisches Musik- und Theaterleben unter dem NS-Staat. Hannover : Europ. Zentrum für Jüdische Musik, 2001 
 Künstler im Exil : in Oper, Konzert, Operette, Tanztheater, Schauspiel, Kabarett, Rundfunk, Film, Musik- und Theaterwissenschaft sowie Ausbildung in 62 Ländern. 2 volumes. Frankfurt : Lang, 1994
 Die Komische Oper Berlin : Geschichte und Gegenwart. Berlin : Komische Oper, 1991
 Ilse Kobán, Stephan Stompor (ed.): Walter Felsenstein : Theater muss immer etwas Totales sein : Briefe, Reden, Aufzeichnungen, Interviews. Berlin : Henschelverlag, 1986
 Giuseppe Verdi, Francesco Maria Piave: La traviata : Oper in drei Akten. Translation Walter Felsenstein. Zum Werk Stephan Stompor. Kassel : Bärenreiter ; Leipzig : Edition Peters, 1984.
 (ed.): Otto Klemperer: Über Musik und Theater : Erinnerungen, Gespräche, Skizzen. Wilhelmshaven : Heinrichshofen, 1982, 1993
 (ed.): Texte zur Aesthetik, Dramaturgie und Aufführungspraxis der deutschen Oper im 18. und 19. Jahrhundert. Berlin : Verband der Theaterschaffenden der Deutschen Demokratischen Republik, 1975
 (ed.): Texte zur Ästhetik, Dramaturgie und Aufführungspraxis der Deutschen Oper  von ihrem Entstehen bis zur Gegenwart : Äußerungen ausländischer Komponisten, Wissenschaftler und Regisseure. Berlin : Verband d. Theaterschaffenden d. DDR, 1977
 (ed.): Musiktheater : Beiträge zur Methodik und zu Inszenierungskonzeptionen. Walter Felsenstein, Joachim Herz. Leipzig : Reclam, 1976. after the 1972 Republikflucht in contrast to the 1970 edition without his contributions. 
 Sergej Prokofjew : das Leben, Schaffen u. Wirken d. sowjet. Komponisten : anlässlich d. 80. Geburtstages Prokofjews im April 1971. Berlin : Gesellschaft f. deutsch-sowjetische Freundschaft, Abt. Kulturpolitik, 1971.
 (ed.): Musiktheater : Beiträge zur Methodik und zu Inszenierungs-Konzeptionen. Walter Felsenstein, Götz Friedrich, Joachim Herz. Leipzig : Reclam, 1970
 Dmitri Schostakowitsch: Katerina Ismailowa : Opera in 4acts (9 Bildern) ; Fassung 1963. Aus dem Russ. übers. by Joachim Herz. Einführung von Stephan Stompor. Leipzig : Reclam 1965 
 Georges Bizet, Henri Meilhac, Ludovic Halévy: Carmen : Oper in vier Akten. Textbuch. Deutsche Fassung von Walter Felsenstein. Einführung von Stephan Stompor. Leipzig : Reclam, 1962
 Deutschsprachige Aufführungen von Opern Händels im 18. Jahrhundert. Dissertation Halle, 1975

References

External links 
 
 

20th-century German musicologists
Dramaturges
1931 births
1995 deaths
People from Chorzów